Leo Adolphus Garnes (born 20 January 1968) is a Barbadian long-distance runner. He competed in the men's 5000 metres at the 1992 Summer Olympics. In 1999, he was charged with the murders of his ex-girlfriend and her sister.

References

External links
 

1968 births
Living people
Athletes (track and field) at the 1992 Summer Olympics
Barbadian male long-distance runners
Olympic athletes of Barbados
Place of birth missing (living people)